Oleg Narinyan (born ) is a Russian curler and curling coach.

Record as a coach of national teams

References

External links 

Living people
1961 births
Russian male curlers
Russian curling coaches
Place of birth missing (living people)